The North-Western Chord is an arterial road in Moscow which is a part of Moscow Chord Ring. Its length is about 30 km. It was fully opened on 29 November, 2019, along with the opening of the New Karamyshevsky Bridge.

Gallery

See also 
 North-Eastern Chord
 South-Eastern Chord

References 

Roads in Moscow